Saint Mark's Episcopal Church is a historic Episcopal church at W. Main and N. Oak Streets in Raymond, Mississippi.

It was built in 1854 and added to the National Register in 1986.

References

Episcopal church buildings in Mississippi
Churches on the National Register of Historic Places in Mississippi
Gothic Revival church buildings in Mississippi
Greek Revival church buildings in Mississippi
Churches completed in 1854
19th-century Episcopal church buildings
Churches in Hinds County, Mississippi
National Register of Historic Places in Hinds County, Mississippi